Saint Jerome in the Wilderness or Saint Jerome in the Desert is a common subject in art depicting Saint Jerome. In practice the same subject is often given titles such as Saint Jerome in Penitence and Saint Jerome Praying (see :Category:Paintings of Jerome). Well-known versions usually given a "wilderness" or "desert" title include:

 Saint Jerome in the Wilderness (Leonardo), unfinished painting by Leonardo da Vinci, now in the Vatican Museums, Rome
 St. Jerome in the Wilderness (Dürer) by Albrecht Durer, executed around 1496, now in the National Gallery in London
 St. Jerome in the Wilderness (Mantegna) attributed to Andrea Mantegna, c. 1450, now in the São Paulo Museum of Art
 Saint Jerome in the Desert (Pinturicchio) by Pinturicchio, c. 1475–80, now in the Walters Art Museum, Baltimore
 Saint Jerome in the Desert (van der Weyden) by Roger van der Weyden or his studio, c. 1450–1465, now in the Detroit Institute of Arts
 St. Jerome in the Desert (Bellini, Florence), a c. 1480 painting by Bellini now in the Uffizi Gallery in Florence
 St. Jerome in the Desert (Bellini, Washington), a later Bellini painting now in the National Gallery of Art in Washington

The Hermit Saints by Hieronymus Bosch, c. 1493, is also an example of this theme.

Christian iconography
Jerome